The Kentucky Wildcats men's basketball statistical leaders are individual statistical leaders of the Kentucky Wildcats men's basketball program in various categories, including points, three-pointers, rebounds, assists, steals, and blocks. Within those areas, the lists identify single-game, single-season, and career leaders. The Wildcats represent the University of Kentucky (UK) in the NCAA Division I Southeastern Conference.

Kentucky began competing in intercollegiate basketball in 1902. However, the school's record book does not generally list records from before the 1950s, as records from before this period are often incomplete and inconsistent. Since scoring was much lower in this era, and teams played much fewer games during a typical season, it is likely that few or no players from this era would appear on these lists anyway.

Official NCAA records date only to the 1937–38 season, the start of what it calls the "modern era" of basketball. That season was the first after the center jump after each made basket was abolished. Weekly recording of scoring leaders started in 1947–48. Rebounding and assists were added in the 1950–51 season. While rebounding has been recorded in each subsequent season, the NCAA stopped recording assists after the 1951–52 season, and did not reinstate assists as an official statistic until 1983–84. Blocks and steals were added in 1985–86, and three-pointers were first officially recorded in 1986–87, the first season in which the three-pointer was mandatory throughout NCAA Division I men's basketball. Apart from three-pointers, which have only been recorded since the three-point shot was nationally adopted, UK's record book includes all seasons, whether or not the NCAA officially recorded those statistics in the relevant seasons.

These lists are updated through the 2022–23 season.

Scoring

Three-pointers

Rebounds

Assists

Steals

Blocks

References

Lists of college basketball statistical leaders by team
Statistical